Mhamed El Khalifa ( – born 1939, Marrakech) is a Moroccan politician of the Istiqlal party. Between 2000 and 2004, he held the positions of Minister of Crafts and Social Economy and Minister of Public Service and the Modernization of the Administration in the cabinets of Driss Jettou and Abderahmane el Youssfi.

See also
Cabinet of Morocco

References

Living people
Government ministers of Morocco
1939 births
People from Marrakesh
20th-century Moroccan lawyers
Istiqlal Party politicians